Imre George Vallyon (born 7 December 1940) is a Hungarian-New Zealand writer in the body, mind and spirit field.
 
Vallyon is the founder of the Foundation for Higher Learning, an international spiritual school formed to help provide people with the opportunity to practice spiritual work within a group environment, with schools in New Zealand, Australia, Germany, Norway, Hungary, and Canada. He is also the director of Sounding-Light Publishing, which was founded in 2006. Vallyon retired in late 2017. In 1998 he was found guilty on several accounts of sexual child molestation, leading to imprisonment.

Early life
Vallyon was born in Budapest, Hungary, and was raised by his parents among extreme poverty and suffering. At the time, Europe was just recovering from World War II, and he was surrounded by that devastation.
 
Vallyon had his first mystical experience at the age of three. It was very dark outside, and he describes the memory as suddenly going "out of my body and into a very profound state of cosmic realization...the whole universe was vibrating like a heavenly choir."
 
In the midst of the 1956 Hungarian Revolution, Vallyon made the dangerous choice to leave the country; crossing the border at the time usually meant imprisonment or death. At the age of sixteen, he emigrated to New Zealand as a refugee.

Career
After immersing himself in several spiritual movements, Vallyon founded the Foundation for Higher Learning, where he teaches the Spiritual Principles and the Divine Laws of Life to Humanity. His methods stem from different forms of eastern and western spirituality. His teaching is universal, not biased towards any particular religion or tradition, yet embraces all traditions and points beyond them all to the One Truth, One Life, One Reality. 
 
Two of Vallyon’s books were among only 40 titles chosen to represent New Zealand as guest of honour at the Frankfurt Book Fair, which is the world’s largest book fair.

In 2008, Vallyon published his most notable book collection so far, Heavens and Hells of the Mind. This four-book set received praise from various critics, who called the books "fascinating" and Vallyon a "visionary". 
 
Additionally in 2008, Vallyon won a major literature prize at the annual nationwide Ashton Wylie Charitable Trust Unpublished Manuscript and Book Awards. These awards recognize excellence in the mind, body, and spirit genres of writing. The judges were highly impressed with Vallyon’s work on his book Heavens and Hells of the Mind, calling it "a remarkable and exhaustive work on human consciousness and the wisdom of the ages."
 
Since 1980, Vallyon has taught the Ageless Wisdom through his writings, workshops, and retreats conducted around the world. Since 2008, Vallyon was invited and has been a member of the New Zealand Society of Authors.
 
Vallyon owns the Waitetuna Retreat Center in Raglan, New Zealand, which is rented out and used by the Foundation for Higher Learning school.

In 1998, Vallyon was tried and convicted in New Zealand by Judge R.P. Wolff for sexually molesting a child. Vallyon was convicted of four representative counts of indecent assault and one count of sexually violating the girl. He was sentenced to three years imprisonment. On 26 February 2017 The Sunday Star Times, a subsidiary of Fairfax Media, released an investigative report exposing Vallyon's crimes.

On 4 February 2020, the news division of the Dutch broadcasting agency NOS released an investigative news report on Vallyon as a result of a breakup between the Dutch Foundation for Higher Learning and the International group. The report states that several new victims have come forward, one of them being only 6 years old during the abuse. The article also says the Dutch Tax Authority has asked questions about illegal use of the ANBI status by Vallyon.

Retirement
In December 2017, after 30 years of teaching at retreats, Vallyon retired at the age of 77.

Awards 
"Heavens and Hells of the Mind", 2009 Gold Medal in the Enlightenment/Spirituality Category of the Living Now Book Awards
"Heavens and Hells of the Mind", 2008 Ashton Wylie Charitable Trust Book Award

Published works

Books

Ebooks

Music

Notes

External links 
Foundation for Higher Learning Official Website
Waitetuna Retreat Centre
Sounding-Light Publishing

1940 births
Living people
Hungarian emigrants to New Zealand
Hungarian spiritual writers
21st-century mystics
Spiritual teachers
21st-century New Zealand writers
New Zealand male writers
21st-century Hungarian male writers
Prisoners and detainees of New Zealand
New Zealand people convicted of child sexual abuse
People convicted of indecent assault